Thomas Davy may refer to:

Thomas Davy (politician) (1890–1933), Minister for Education (Western Australia)
Thomas Davy (cyclist) (born 1968), former French cyclist

See also
Thomas Davey (disambiguation)